Hermes Ernesto da Fonseca (September 1824 – February 7, 1891) was a Brazilian military officer and politician.

History

Biography 
The eldest son of Manuel Mendes da Fonseca (1785–1859) and Rosa Maria Paulina da Fonseca (1802–1873), he was the brother of Marshal Deodoro da Fonseca and father of the future president of the Brazilian republic, named after him, Hermes Rodrigues da Fonseca. He was also the brother of Severiano Martins da Fonseca, the Baron of Alagoa.

From a military family, he pursued a career as his father and six brothers, serving in the Paraguayan War.

After the Proclamation of the Republic he occupied the command of the army troops in Salvador. Although brother of the new president, it took him along to join the new regime, only accepting it after news of the departure of the Brazilian imperial family to Europe.

He was an amateur musician, having composed sacred and military songs (such as Polca do Regimento and mazurca Icamacuá). He was married to Rita Rodrigues Barbosa da Fonseca and is buried in the Caju Cemetery.

President of the Province of Mato Grosso 
He was president of the province of Mato Grosso from July 5, 1875, to March 2, 1878, appointed by imperial letter of May 1, 1875.

Governor of Bahia 
Bahia was one of the last states to join the new regime, succeeding several intervenors who, due to the unstable climate, did not last in the post. Appointed by brother President Hermes da Fonseca, he took over from Manuel Vitorino, who was indisposing with the federal government, staying only five months ahead of the post, stepping down for health reasons, passing the post to the vice-president, Virgílio Clímaco Damásio.

He ruled Bahia from April 26 to September 14, 1890, a period in which he sought to calm tempers and consolidate the institutions of the new regime. He revoked several acts of his predecessor, including educational reform.

References 

1824 births
1891 deaths